David Olaniyi Oyedepo (born 27 September 1954) is a Nigerian preacher, Christian author, businessman, architect and the founder of the Living Faith Church Worldwide, and presiding Bishop of the Faith Tabernacle in Ota, Ogun State, Nigeria. The church is also known as Winners' Chapel International.

The Winners' Chapel International network of churches is located in over 300 cities, in all states of Nigeria, and in several cities in 45 African nations, Dubai, the United Kingdom and the United States, Europe, Asia and Canada. Oyedepo has been seen as one of the pioneers of the Christian charismatic movement in Africa and has been referred to as one of the most powerful preachers in Nigeria. He is the Chancellor of Covenant University and Landmark University. He was named in 2011 by Forbes magazine as being the richest pastor in Nigeria.

Early life
On 27 September 1954, David Olaniyi Oyedepo was born in Osogbo, Nigeria, but is a native of Omu-Aran, Irepodun Local Government Area of Kwara State. He was raised in a mixed religious family. His father, Ibrahim, was a Muslim healer. His mother, Dorcas, was a member of the Holy Order of the Cherubim and Seraphim Movement Church (C&S), a branch of the Aladura movement in Nigeria. He was raised by his grandmother in Osogbo, who introduced him to the virtues of Christian life via early morning prayers which she attended with him. She also taught him the importance of tithing.

Education 
Oyedepo studied architecture at the Kwara State Polytechnic Ilorin. He also received a PhD in Human Development from Honolulu University, Hawaii, US.

Career 
Oyedepo worked briefly with the Federal Ministry of Housing in Ilorin before resigning to concentrate on missionary work

Ministry
Oyedepo was "born again" in 1969, through the influence of his teacher, Betty Lasher, who took an interest in him during his high school days. According to him, he received a mandate from God through an 18-hour vision in May 1981, to liberate the world from all oppressions of the devil through the preaching of the word of faith. This is the inaugural vision that led to the founding of the Living Faith Church World Wide (LFCWW), first called Liberation Faith Hour Ministries, in 1981. Two years later, on September 17, 1983, Pastor Enoch Adeboye, General Overseer of the Redeemed Christian Church of God, ordained David and his wife, Florence Abiola Akano (known as Faith Abiola Oyedepo) to become pastors and officially commissioned the new church. Five years later, Oyedepo was ordained as Bishop by his life mentor, the late Archbishop Benson Idahosa.

Living Faith Church (AKA Winners Chapel International) started in Kaduna but moved to Lagos, the former capital of Nigeria in July 1989, to start a new branch of the church after Oyedepo claimed to have received instructions from God to reach out to the people of Lagos.

According to Forbes, Oyedepo is the wealthiest preacher in the world with a net worth of over US$150 million. The church owns four private jets and several buildings, including in London and the US. Oyedepo is an author and publisher who has written over 70 titles apart from periodicals. He is the chairman/publisher of Dominion Publishing House (DPH), a publishing arm of the ministry. DPH has over 4 million prints in circulation to date. Through Oyedepo; Covenant University, Faith Academy, and Kingdom Heritage Model Schools have been established to equip the youth for global impact. The construction of a third university named Crown University is already underway, located in Calabar, Cross River, Nigeria.

In 1998, Oyedepo claimed he was instructed by God to build a new base for the commission to accommodate the increasing number of worshippers. This resulted in Oyedepo's church's acquisition of the initial  facility, known as Canaanland, which serves as the headquarters. It is the home of the 50,000-seat capacity auditorium, the 'Faith Tabernacle'. This was a feat also recorded by the Guinness Book of Records.

Construction was completed within 12 months. Reports also claimed that this building was built debt free.
This 50,000-seat edifice was dedicated on September 18, 1999, under the administration of former President Olusegun Obasanjo.

Canaanland is in Ota, Ogun state and is the  estate and campus, that houses The 50,000-seat auditorium, the church secretariat, the church's youth chapel, a primary school called Kingdom heritage model school, a full boarding mission secondary school called Faith Academy, with over 1,500 students and the Covenant University facilities - which accommodates over 7,000 students, fully resident in ultra-modern hostel facilities - with fully equipped faculty buildings and numerous staff housing facilities. Canaanland campus also has for-profit establishments operated by the church such as a bakery, a bottled water processing plant, a petrol station, various restaurants and shopping stores, several residential houses that provide for the over 2,000 church employees and guesthouses. Four banks are also present on this Estate, three of which are branches of external commercial banks and one which is a community and micro-finance Bank and operated by the Church. The whole of Canaanland which includes a proposed 15,000 housing estate known as Canaan City had increased to 17,000 acres as of 2012.

The Ministry's biggest annual meeting Shiloh, holds every December in the same Faith Tabernacle and often welcomes thousands of congregants across the world. The ministry is currently building a 100,000 seater auditorium called the "Ark", which is reputed to be the building with the largest span in the world.

Christian ministry
The teachings of Oyedepo have put him in the category of what is commonly called the Word of Faith Movement.
He has referred to principal exponents of the Faith Movement such as Kenneth Copeland, Gloria Copeland, the late Kenneth Hagin, E. W. Kenyon, T. L. Osborn, Smith Wigglesworth as well as renowned Nigerian preachers; Enoch Adeboye and the late Benson Idahosa as mentors. As with many of his influences, Oyedepo has been described as a preacher of the prosperity gospel.

Winners' Chapel International operates a Bible training programme known as the Word of Faith Bible Institute for members and non-members alike to develop knowledge of Christian principles as well as to develop leaders and future pastors. The institute is run in major branches of the Church.

Oyedepo is the president of David Oyedepo Ministries International (DOMI). DOMI is the umbrella organisation comprising Living Faith Church World Wide (a global network of churches), World Mission
Agency (WMA); the global missionary arm of the church's operations, Dominion Publishing House; the publishing arm of the church, Covenant University, and the Social Development Missions projects - made up of hospitals, maternity homes, schools, etc.

Oyedepo has criticised corruption in Africa as a whole and poor leadership in government.

He is also a critic of Nigeria's current President Muhammadu Buhari.

Book publishing
Oyedepo's church operates its own publishing house, called Dominion Publishing House (DPH), commissioned on December 5, 1992, which has published over 70 Christian, inspirational and motivational books, mini-books, magazines and other resources.

Family
In 1982 he married Florence Abiola Akano (now known as Faith Oyedepo). They have four children together (David Jr, Isaac, Love and Joyce). David Oyedepo Jr and Isaac Oyedepo were ordained as Pastors in May 2007 by Kenneth Copeland. David Oyedepo Jr formerly pastored the London Branch of the Church with his wife, Kemi but is now the resident pastor of the Ministry's headquarters church (Faith Tabernacle) while Isaac Oyedepo pastors Winners' Chapel International, Maryland, in the United States of America with his wife Ayomitide. His first daughter Love is married to Stephen Ogah, who also pastors in Winners' Chapel.  Joyce Priscilla is the last child and second daughter. She married  Abimbola Abodunrin in 2020.

David Oyedepo Day of Service (DODOS) 
The DODOS is an initiative set up by the Covenant University Alumni Association with the aim to promote the contributions and lifestyle of Oyedepo. Started on 27 September 2012, Oyedepo's birthday, people around the world who connect with this initiative are expected to show an act of contribution to individuals, organizations or the society at large.

References

External links

 David Oyedepo ministries
 Faith Tabernacle

Living people
1954 births
20th-century Nigerian architects
20th-century Protestant religious leaders
21st-century Nigerian architects
21st-century Protestant religious leaders
Founders of Nigerian schools and colleges
Kwara State University alumni
Nigerian Christian clergy
Nigerian Christian writers
Nigerian Pentecostal pastors
People from Osogbo
Prosperity theologians
University and college founders
Academic staff of Landmark University
Covenant University people